Richard Alexander Kelly (born 19 February 1984, in Trinidad), is a West Indian cricketer. He plays first-class and List A cricket for Trinidad and Tobago. He is known for his hard–hitting and accurate swing bowling. He was named the Top allrounder in the West Indies after his performances in the 2006 Carib Beer Regional Tournament. He is also the owner and head coach at Kelly's Cricket Academy in Trinidad and Tobago and Canada and was also Assistant Coach for Barbados Tridents in 2020 and head coach of Trinity College East Cricket Team.

References

1984 births
Living people
Trinidad and Tobago cricketers